The Black List is a series of films created from 2008 through 2010 as part of The Black List Project, a film, book and museum tour of photographs conceived by photographer/filmmaker Timothy Greenfield-Sanders, with Elvis Mitchell, public radio host and former New York Times film critic.

Volume 1
The Black List: Volume 1 premiered at Sundance Film Festival in 2008 and then in August of that year on HBO.

The Black List: Volume 1 won the NAACP Spirit Award in 2009 for best documentary. "The Black List Sold to HBO" 

Volume 1 includes: Bill T. Jones, Chris Rock, Colin Powell, Slash, Dawn Staley, Faye Wattleton, Kareem Abdul-Jabbar, Keenen Ivory Wayans, Lorna Simpson, Louis Gossett Jr., Mahlon Duckett, Marc Morial, Rev. Al Sharpton, Richard D. Parsons, Russell Simmons, Sean Combs, Serena Williams, Steven Stoute, Susan Rice, Suzan-Lori Parks, Thelma Golden, Toni Morrison, Vernon Jordan, William Rice and Zane.

Volume 2
The Black List: Volume 2 is the follow-up to The Black List: Volume 1. It premiered on HBO in February 2009.

The Black List: Volume 2 includes Angela Davis, Bishop Barbara Harris, Bishop T.D. Jakes, Charley Pride, Dr. Valerie Montgomery-Rice, Governor Deval Patrick, Kara Walker, Majora Carter, Laurence Fishburne, Maya Rudolph, Melvin Van Peebles, Patrick Robinson, Rza, Suzanne De Passe, and Tyler Perry.

Volume 3
The Black List: Volume III was released in February 2010 and includes interviews with Beverly Johnson, Debra L. Lee, Dr. Michael Lomax, Hill Harper, John Legend, LaTanya Richardson, Lee Daniels and Whoopi Goldberg.

References

External links
Timothy Greenfield-Sanders' official site

Documentary films about African Americans
Film series introduced in 2008
Films directed by Timothy Greenfield-Sanders